Muravanka is a village in Belarus. It is located in the Shchuchyn District of Grodno Region.

The village is famous for its fortified church of the Nativity of the Blessed Virgin Mary.

Name
The village received its name after the brick walls of the church.

History
Since foundation in the 16th century Muravanka was a part of the Grand Duchy of Lithuania. In 1795 the Polish–Lithuanian Commonwealth was partitioned between Russia, Prussia and Austria and the village became a part of the Russian Empire. After World War I it's a place in Nowogródek Voivodeship of the Second Polish Republic and after World War 2 it was returned to Belarus.

External links 

 Photos at Globus.TUT.by
 Photos at radzima.org

Villages in Belarus
Populated places in Grodno Region
Shchuchyn District